Don Petersen may refer to:
Don Petersen (playwright) (1927-1998), American playwright
Donald Petersen (born 1926), American businessman